Azad Jammu Kashmir Medical College (Urdu: , Koshur; آزاد جۄٚم تہٕ کشیٖر طِبہ ژاٹٔھل )or (AJKMC) is a public medical institute located in Muzaffarabad, Azad Jammu & Kashmir, Pakistan. AJKMC is home to 500 students in the MBBS program, with clinical rotations occurring at Combined Military Hospital Muzaffarabad and Abbas Institute of Medical Sciences. AJKMC was established and recognized by the Pakistan Medical and Dental Council in 2011.

History
AJKMC was inaugurated by Prime Minister Syed Yousaf Raza Gillani on 8 October 2011. Establishing a medical college was deemed necessary following the 2005 Kashmir Earthquake, which exposed a shortage of medical professionals at medical facilities in Azad Jammu and Kashmir.

Affiliations and recognitions
The college is affiliated and recognized by following Organizations and Institutes:
Abbas Institute of Medical Sciences (AIMS Hospital)
College of Physicians and Surgeons Pakistan
Combined Military Hospital Muzaffarabad
International Medical Education Directory (IMED)
Pakistan Medical and Dental Council
University of Azad Jammu and Kashmir
University of Health Sciences, Lahore

Publications
The official scientific journals of the college is Kashmir Journal of Medical Sciences (KJMS). It contains original articles, case reports, review articles, short communication, letters to editor, and view points.

See also
List of medical schools in Pakistan
Medical Education in Pakistan

References

External links

Universities and colleges in Azad Kashmir